Ata-ur-Rahman is a masculine Islamic given name. It is built from the Arabic words Ata, al- and Rahman. The name means "gift of the most merciful", ar-Rahman being one of the names of God in the Qur'an, which give rise to the Muslim theophoric names.

The letter a of the al- is unstressed, and can be transliterated by almost any vowel, usually by u. Because the letter r is a sun letter, the letter l of the al- is assimilated to it. Thus although the name is written in Arabic and Urdu with letters corresponding to Ata al-Rahman, the usual pronunciation corresponds to Ata ur-Rahman. The transliteration Atta often appears for the first element and Rehman for the last, all subject to variable spacing and hyphenation.

Notable bearers of the name include
Atta ur Rehman Khan, Pakistani computer scientist
Ataur Rahman Khan (1907–1991), former Prime Minister of Bangladesh
Ataur Rahman (poet) (1925–1999), Bangladeshi poet
Khan Ataur Rahman (1928–1997), Bangladeshi film actor, director, producer, screenplay writer, music composer, and singer
Ataur Rahman Khan Khadim (1933-1971), Bangladeshi academic
Ataur Rahman (born 1941), Bangladeshi theater actor and director
Ataur Rahman Mazarbhuiya, Indian Politician
Atta ur Rahman (scientist) (born 1942), Pakistani organic chemist
Atiur Rahman (born 1951), Bangladeshi economist
Maulana Atta Ur Rehman (born 1965), Pakistani politician
Ataurrehman (born 1968), Indian politician
Ata-ur-Rehman (cricketer) (born 1975), Pakistani cricketer
Ata-ur-Rehman (cricketer, born 1986), Pakistani cricketer
Atta-Ur-Rehman Chishti, known as Rehman Chishti (born 1978), British politician
Atta ur Rehman Memon, Pakistani electrical engineer

See also 

 Ataur Rahman (disambiguation) –Disambiguation page.

References

Arabic masculine given names
Pakistani masculine given names